HUSAR is the Toronto Heavy Urban Search and Rescue unit CAN-TF3 - an urban search and rescue unit able to respond to disaster situations at a city, provincial and national level, as well as offer international assistance.

CAN-TF3 is operated by Toronto Fire Services, in collaboration with Toronto Police Service and Toronto EMS created to deal with search and rescue operations in the City of Toronto. This specialized unit was created following the September 11 attacks in New York City, United States and allows the city to deal with large-scale disasters. The unit can respond to situations outside of the city, and offer provincial, national, as well as international assistance.

The cities of Vancouver, Calgary, and the province of Manitoba, also currently have, or are developing, similar interoperable Heavy USAR capacity.

Roles and responsibilities

 Search and Rescue
 Emergency Medical Services
 Planning & Technical Information
 Logistics
 Command

Equipment

Deployments

A list of major deployments of CAN-TF3:

 December 2020 - London, Ontario building collapse 
 June 2016 - Mississauga natural gas explosion
 June 2012 - Collapse of the Algo Centre Mall roof/parking structure in Elliot Lake, Ontario
 August 2011 - Goderich Tornado
 April 2003 - Bloor Street West natural gas explosion in Toronto

See also

 Toronto Fire Services
 Toronto EMS
 Toronto Police Service
 Toronto Office of Emergency Management
 Disaster Assistance Response Team and Canadian Forces Search and Rescue
 Urban Search and Rescue New York Task Force 1

Other similar units
 Vancouver (CAN-TF1) Heavy Urban Search and Rescue
 Calgary (CAN-TF2) Heavy Urban Search and Rescue
 Manitoba (CAN-TF4) Heavy Urban Search and Rescue
 Halifax (CAN-TF5) Heavy Urban Search and Rescue
Halifax Regional Search and Rescue
 Halifax Regional Fire and Emergency

References

Rescue agencies
Emergency services in Canada
Municipal government of Toronto